The following lists events that happened during 1914 in Chile.

Incumbents
President of Chile: Ramón Barros Luco

Events

March
29 March – Mana Expedition to Easter Island

May
8 May – The Con Con National football club is founded.

November
1 November – World War I: Battle of Coronel

Births
7 May – Radomiro Tomic (d. 1992)
11 May – Arturo Bucciardi (d. 1970)
5 September – Nicanor Parra (d. 2018)
8 November – Juan Acevedo Pavez (d. 2010)

Deaths 
9 March – Alejandro Bello (b. 1887)

References 

 
Years of the 20th century in Chile
Chile